Jærbladet is a Norwegian local newspaper published in Bryne, at Jæren in county Rogaland. It covers the three municipalities: Time, Hå and Klepp. It is issued three days a week, Monday, Wednesday and Friday. It started in 1949. The newspaper tends to use  the written form of nynorsk (modernized Norwegian), typical for the western counties, but bokmål (modernized Dano-Norwegian) as well.

Jærbladet is published by Jærbladet AS, which is owned by Jæren Avis AS which is owned by 33.3% by Dalane Tidende & Egersund Avis AS and two other agents.

Circulation
2007: 13,064, of whom 12,862 are subscribers.
2008: 13,264, of whom 13,032 are subscribers.

References
Norwegian Media Registry

External links
 Website: jbl.no 

Newspapers established in 1949
Newspapers published in Norway
Jæren